Tanjore is the anglicised name of Thanjavur, a city in Tamil Nadu, India

Tanjore may also refer to:
Tanjore painting, which originated in Thanjavur
Tanjore Nayaks, the rulers of Thanjavur between 16th and 19th century C.E
Tanjore Maharashtrian community
Thanjavur Marathi (disambiguation)
Tanjore, a special Air India aircraft which carries the President of India and the Prime Minister of India
Tanjore Ranganathan, a carnatic musician
Edward Tanjore Corwin, an American writer